Void is the ninth studio album by the Christian metal band War of Ages. It was released on September 13, 2019, and produced by the band's guitarist, Jack Daniels. It is the only studio album by the band to feature Kaleb Leubchow on drums, as Leubchow died in 2022 following the release of the EP Rhema.

Track listing

Personnel
Credits adapted from liner notes.
War of Ages
 Leroy Hamp – vocals
 Steve Brown – guitar
 Jack Daniels – guitar, production, mixing, engineering
 Kaleb Leubchow – drums
 Elisha Mullins – vocals, bass

Additional personnel
 Troy Glessner – mastering
 Coty Walker – editing
 Will Beaseley – editing
 Rick King – engineering
 Andy Cutrell – backing vocals
 Jacob Brand – programming
 Dave Quiggle – album artwork & design
 Jim Hughes – layout

References

 

War of Ages albums
Facedown Records albums
2019 albums